Nara (Bambara: ߣߊߙߊ tr. Nara) is a town and rural commune in the Koulikoro Region of southwestern Mali. The town is the administrative center of the  Nara Cercle.

In the 2009 census the commune had a population of 19,793.

References

External links
.

Communes of Koulikoro Region